Gnoma boisduvali is a species of beetle in the family Cerambycidae. It was described by Plavilstshikov in 1931. It is known from Papua New Guinea.

References

Lamiini
Beetles described in 1931